The 2014 NCAA Division I men's soccer season was the 56th season of NCAA championship men's college soccer. The regular season began in late August 2014 and continued into November 2014. The season culminated with the 2014 NCAA Division I Men's Soccer Championship in December 2014.   There are 205 teams in men's Division I competition. The defending champions were the Notre Dame Fighting Irish who won its first NCAA soccer title by defeating the Maryland 2-1 in the 2013 College Cup. The season concluded with Virginia defeating UCLA  0–0 (4–2 PKs) to win its seventh NCAA soccer title.

Changes from 2013

Conference changes 
 The Sun Belt Conference added men's soccer, absent since 1995, with three full member schools plus two ex-independent teams and a transfer from another conference joining the conference for 2014 as affiliate members.

New programs 
 Utah Valley inaugurated the sport as a requirement for membership in the Western Athletic Conference.
 Pacific reinstated the sport, dormant since 1985, as a requirement for membership in the West Coast Conference.

Discontinued programs 

None.

Conference realignment

Season overview

Pre-season polls 
Several American soccer outlets posted their own preseason top 25 rankings of what were believed to be the strongest men's collegiate soccer teams entering 2014.

Regular season

#1

Standings

Major upsets 

In this list, a "major upset" is defined as a game won by a team ranked 10 or more spots lower or an unranked team that defeats a team ranked #15 or higher.

Statistics

Individuals

Last update on December 14, 2014. Source: NCAA.com - Total GoalsLast update on December 14, 2014. Source: NCAA.com - Goals Against AverageLast update on December 14, 2014. Source: NCAA.com - Total AssistsLast update on December 14, 2014. Source: NCAA.com - Save pct

Last update on December 14, 2014. Source: NCAA.com - Total PointsLast update on December 14, 2014. Source: NCAA.com - Total Saves

Teams
Last update on December 14, 2014. Source: NCAA.com - Goals/GameLast update on December 14, 2014. Source: NCAA.com - Team GAA

Last update on December 14, 2014. Source: NCAA.com - SO Pct

All statistics are through the games of December 14, 2014. (Final)Last update on December 14, 2014. Source: NCAA.com - Team W-L-T pct

NCAA tournament

The College Cup was played at WakeMed Soccer Park in Cary, North Carolina on December 12 & 14, 2014. In the semifinals, Virginia defeated UMBC 1–0 and UCLA beat Providence 3–2 in double overtime. In the finals, Virginia and UCLA played to a scoreless draw through two extra periods, and Virginia won its seventh national crown on penalty kicks, 4–2.

Postseason polls
Post season polls with (pre-season rankings).

See also 
 College soccer
 List of NCAA Division I men's soccer programs
 2014 in American soccer
 2014 NCAA Division I Men's Soccer Championship

References 

 
NCAA